Rio del Mar (Spanish: Río del Mar, meaning "River of the Sea") is an unincorporated village in Santa Cruz County, California. Rio del Mar is one of several small villages that form the unincorporated community of Aptos, California. Its population was 9,128 as of the 2020 United States census.

Etymology
The name, from Spanish: Río del Mar, meaning river of the sea, was chosen to promote real estate in the area during the 1920s.

Geography

Rio del Mar is located at  (36.963764, -121.887690).

For statistical purposes, the United States Census Bureau has defined Rio del Mar as a census-designated place (CDP). The census definition of the area may not precisely correspond to local understanding of the area with the same name.

Aptos Creek goes through Rio del Mar and empties into the Monterey Bay.

Demographics

2010
At the 2010 census Rio del Mar had a population of 9,216. The racial makeup of Rio del Mar was 8,310 (90.2%) White, 61 (0.7%) African American, 50 (0.5%) Native American, 313 (3.4%) Asian, 7 (0.1%) Pacific Islander, 188 (2.0%) from other races, and 287 (3.1%) from two or more races. Hispanic or Latino of any race were 899 people (9.8%).

The census reported that 9,210 people (99.9% of the population) lived in households, 6 (0.1%) lived in non-institutionalized group quarters, and no one was institutionalized.

There were 3,916 households, 1,050 (26.8%) had children under the age of 18 living in them, 2,082 (53.2%) were opposite-sex married couples living together, 337 (8.6%) had a female householder with no husband present, 139 (3.5%) had a male householder with no wife present.  There were 228 (5.8%) unmarried opposite-sex partnerships, and 32 (0.8%) same-sex married couples or partnerships. 1,008 households (25.7%) were one person and 486 (12.4%) had someone living alone who was 65 or older. The average household size was 2.35.  There were 2,558 families (65.3% of households); the average family size was 2.82.

The age distribution was 1,820 people (19.7%) under the age of 18, 549 people (6.0%) aged 18 to 24, 1,932 people (21.0%) aged 25 to 44, 3,221 people (35.0%) aged 45 to 64, and 1,694 people (18.4%) who were 65 or older.  The median age was 47.0 years. For every 100 females, there were 92.6 males.  For every 100 females age 18 and over, there were 90.2 males.

There were 4,924 housing units at an average density of 1,067.6 per square mile, of the occupied units 2,848 (72.7%) were owner-occupied and 1,068 (27.3%) were rented. The homeowner vacancy rate was 1.9%; the rental vacancy rate was 8.4%.  6,686 people (72.5% of the population) lived in owner-occupied housing units and 2,524 people (27.4%) lived in rental housing units.

2000

At the 2000 census there were 9,198 people, 4,008 households, and 2,549 families in the CDP. The racial makeup of the CDP was 91.74% White, 0.61% African American, 0.53% Native American, 2.58% Asian, 0.16% Pacific Islander, 1.87% from other races, and 2.51% from two or more races. Hispanic or Latino of any race were 6.46%.

Of the 4,008 households 25.4% had children under the age of 18 living with them, 53.0% were married couples living together, 7.4% had a female householder with no husband present, and 36.4% were non-families. 26.0% of households were one person and 10.4% were one person aged 65 or older.  The average household size was 2.29 and the average family size was 2.74.

The age distribution was 19.2% under the age of 18, 5.8% from 18 to 24, 26.8% from 25 to 44, 31.9% from 45 to 64, and 16.3% 65 or older.  The median age was 44 years. For every 100 females, there were 92.3 males.  For every 100 females age 18 and over, there were 90.9 males.

The median household income was $75,282 and the median family income  was $85,355. Males had a median income of $70,612 versus $41,449 for females. The per capita income for the CDP was $39,034.  About 3.1% of families and 6.3% of the population were below the poverty line, including 4.5% of those under age 18 and 4.6% of those age 65 or over.

Government

Parks

Rio del Mar neighbors Seacliff State Beach, which features the remains of the cement ship, the SS Palo Alto. The ship was launched May 29, 1919. It was too late for duty in World War I, and after the war was beached as an entertainment boat, with amenities including a dance floor, a swimming pool and a cafe. Today, it remains swamped, broken, and off-limits, adjoining a fishing pier.

References

External links
Santa Cruz Wiki – The People's Guide to Santa Cruz County, California.

Census-designated places in Santa Cruz County, California
Aptos, California
Census-designated places in California
Populated coastal places in California